A partial lunar eclipse will take place on November 30, 2039. At 3 hours 26 minutes, it is the longest partial lunar eclipse since November 19, 2021, which is the previous member of Lunar Saros 126.

Visibility

Related lunar eclipses

Lunar year series (354 days)

Saros series

Half-Saros cycle
A lunar eclipse will be preceded and followed by solar eclipses by 9 years and 5.5 days (a half saros). This lunar eclipse is related to two total solar eclipses of Solar Saros 133.

See also
List of lunar eclipses and List of 21st-century lunar eclipses

Notes

External links

2039-11
2039-11
2039 in science